St. Mary's Regional Medical Center may refer to:

United States
Saint Mary's Regional Medical Center (Arkansas), a hospital in Arkansas
St. Mary's Regional Medical Center (Lewiston), Maine
Saint Mary's Regional Medical Center (Reno, Nevada)
St. Mary's Regional Medical Center (Enid), Enid, Oklahoma

See also
St. Mary's Medical Center (disambiguation)
St. Mary's Hospital (disambiguation)
St. Mary Medical Center (disambiguation)